In the Company of Spies (also known as The Agency) is a 1999 made-for-television spy action thriller film directed by Tim Matheson and starring Tom Berenger, Ron Silver, Alice Krige, and Clancy Brown.

Plot
A CIA operative (Clancy Brown) is arrested and accused of being a spy by Korean officials. The CIA want to get him back as he has vital information for the United States. To rescue their operative, they recruit Kevin Jefferson (Tom Berenger), a retired CIA operative to create and lead the team to rescue the operative before the Koreans break him.

Cast
 Tom Berenger as Kevin Jefferson
 Ron Silver as Tom Lenahan
 Alice Krige as Sarah Gold
 Clancy Brown as Dale Beckman
 Arye Gross as Todd Simar
 Elizabeth Arlen as Joanne Gertz
 Al Waxman as Myron Sindell
 Len Cariou as The President

References

External links

1999 television films
1999 films
1990s spy films
1999 action thriller films
Action television films
American thriller television films
Films scored by Don Davis (composer)
Showtime (TV network) films
Films directed by Tim Matheson
1990s American films